= Continuously Shooting Blunderbuss =

Historical Chinese weapon

- Chinese: 连珠铳
- Invented: 1674
- Inventor: Dai Zi
- Usage: Putting down Geng Jingzhong's Rebellion

The Continuously Shooting Blunderbuss (simplified Chinese: 连珠铳; traditional Chinese: 連珠銃), also known as "Lianzhu Huochong" (连珠火铳), was a kind of breech-loading, smooth-bore, single-shot flintlock, invented by Dai Zi (戴梓), a firearms expert in the early Qing Dynasty, in the thirteenth year of Kangxi (1674).

== Usage ==
The Continuously Shooting Blunderbuss could fire 28 lead pellets at a time and was powerful. These guns played an important role in quelling Geng Jingzhong's Rebellion (耿精忠叛乱).
